UNESCO's City of Gastronomy project is part of the wider Creative Cities Network. The Network was launched in 2004, and organizes member cities into seven creative fields: Crafts and Folk Art, Design, Film, Gastronomy, Literature, Media Arts, and Music.

Criteria for Cities of Gastronomy

To be approved as a City of Gastronomy, cities need to meet a number of criteria set by UNESCO:
Well-developed gastronomy that is characteristic of the urban centre and/or region;
 Vibrant gastronomy community with numerous traditional restaurants and/or chefs;
 Indigenous ingredients used in traditional cooking;
 Local know-how, traditional culinary practices and methods of cooking that have survived industrial/technological advancement;
 Traditional food markets and traditional food industry;
 Tradition of hosting gastronomic festivals, awards, contests and other broadly-targeted means of recognition;
 Respect for the environment and promotion of sustainable local products;
 Nurturing of public appreciation, promotion of nutrition in educational institutions and inclusion of biodiversity conservation programmes in cooking schools curricula.

Cities submit bids to UNESCO to be designated, which reviewed every four years.

About the cities

The first City of Gastronomy was Popayán, Colombia, designated in 2005. It hosts an annual National Gastronomic Congress of Popayán.

Chengdu, China, is the capital of Sichuan and Sichuanese cuisine, one of the most popular types of cuisine in China. The city is the birthplace of numerous dishes, including mapo doufu and dan dan noodles, and has a distinct and vibrant tea house culture.

Bergen, Norway, is a port city with a long history in seafood trade. Local gastronomy thrives on organic food. Bergen hosts the world’s largest conference on seafood, the North Atlantic Seafood Forum Conference, and is also home to the Centre of Expertise for Sustainable Seafood and the National Institute of Nutrition and Seafood Research.

Rasht, Iran, represents Iranian cookery. The dominant foods are various types of fish. The region is famous for several distinctive dishes as well as the typical cooking method in Gamaj clay pots.

Tucson, Arizona, USA, has been selected because of "region's rich agricultural heritage, thriving food traditions, and culinary distinctiveness". Tucson is well known for its Sonoran-style Mexican food.

Alba, Italy, is famous for its white truffles and vineyards. The city is referred to as the White Truffle Capital and holds an annual Truffle Festival. Alba also played the key role in the creation and development of the Slow Food movement.

Bergamo, Italy, is famous for its history of cheese making, renowned for its award-winning and famous cheese products, as well as other forms of traditional food production. Bergamo has also advocated for greater sustainability in food production and support of its farmers and traditional methods of agriculture.

Macau,  an autonomous region on the south coast of China, represents a unique blend of Cantonese and Portuguese influence in culinary arts. An example is African chicken, a dish which includes Asian ingredients next to peri-peri peppers brought from Mozambique by Portuguese explorers. The city holds Macao Food Festival and other food-related events.

Belém, Brazil, a territory of which 65% is situated across 39 islands, provides diversity of local food products such as seafood, açaí, cocoa and pupunha. The city has a famous historic food market, Ver-o-Peso, where food-related events are held.

Three additional Brazilian cities are also designated as Cities of Gastronomy: Florianópolis, Belo Horizonte, and Paraty. Florianopolis was designated due to its hosting of annual food festivals and its oyster industry; Belo Horizonte because of its coffee industry and the mixing of various cultures that flocked to the city influencing its cuisine, and Paraty because of the blending of Portuguese, Indigenous, and African cultures leading to the creation of some of Brazil's most famous cuisine such as paçoca and farofa-de-feijão and its history in making of cachaça.

Hyderabad, India, the capital of Telangana state, shows the flourishing of two of India's most famous cuisines-- Hyderabadi and Telugu cuisine—and the resulting fusion and blending of them in Hyderabad. As a result, Hyderabad is famous for dishes that show the influences of both cultures, such as Hyderabadi biryani, Hyderabadi haleem, murtabak, upma, dosa, and avakaya. Events and festivals such as Ramzan and Bathukamma promote and cultivate the city's unique and diverse gastronomic culture.

Overstrand Hermanus, South Africa, is designated as a City of Gastronomy for its wine industry, gastronomic arts events, and its promotion of sustainable food production, such as creating abalone farms to ease pressure on ocean ecosystems. 

Four Turkish cities are designated as Cities of Gastronomy by UNESCO: Afyonkarahisar, for its major industry in food production and animal husbandry, as well as production of Turkish delight and clotted cream; Hatay, for its rich cuisine as a center of the spice trade, as well as empowerment of women and refugees in the food industry; Gaziantep, for the importance of production of cereals, spices, dried fruits, and pistachios to the regional economy, and innovation in renewable and sustainable food production; and Kayseri. 

There are 50 Cities of Gastronomy. Twelve countries have more than one designated city. China has five if Macao is included, Brazil and Turkey both have four, Italy has three Cities of Gastronomy, while Australia, Colombia, Iran, Japan, Mexico, Spain, Thailand and United States have all two entries on the list.

The Cities of Gastronomy are:

See also
City of Crafts and Folk Arts
City of Film
City of Literature
City of Music
Design Cities

References

External links

 Creative Cities Map, UNESCO.

Lists of cities
UNESCO